Ryan Culwell is an American singer, songwriter, and guitarist based in Nashville, Tennessee. His third full-length album The Last American was released by Missing Piece Records on August 24, 2018.

Biography 
Growing up in the Texas Panhandle, Culwell's family labored in oilfields and the trucking industry. Hoping for a different life, Culwell went to college to study economics, but eventually left to pursue his musical career while working odd jobs on the side. Through the years Culwell has worked as a roofing salesman, landscaper, tree cutter, and pedal tavern driver. In 2006 he released his debut Heroes on the Radio, and in 2015 he released his second album Flatlands.

Culwell's music has been compared to that of Bruce Springsteen, Steve Earle, and The War on Drugs, and he's played shows with Patty Griffin, Hayes Carll, Ashley Monroe, Billy Joe Shaver, and Amy Speace.

Discography 

 Heroes on the Radio (2006)
 Flatlands (2015)
 The Last American (2018)
Run Like A Bull (2022)

References 

Living people
American male singer-songwriters
21st-century American singers
People from Perryton, Texas
Musicians from Nashville, Tennessee
1980 births
21st-century American male singers
Singer-songwriters from Tennessee
Singer-songwriters from Texas